The Orakzai and Kurram offensive, also known as Operation Khwakh Ba De Sham was a Pakistani military operation against the Tehrik-i-Taliban in the Orakzai Agency and Kurram Agency area of the Federally Administered Tribal Areas that began on 23 March 2010. It was part of the War in North-West Pakistan.

Timeline

23 March. Start of Offensive
On 23 March 2010 the Pakistani army has launched a military operation to clear insurgents from Orakzai."This will finish in a couple of months. We'll take care of all of them. We're just waiting for the major operations — like Orakzai and North Waziristan — to finish, to spare us the troops to start changing our methodology. Instead of kinetic, concentrated operations, we start search and cordon and sting operations, for which actually you need more boots on the ground," said Tariq Khan. On 1 April 2010 security forces claimed to have taken complete control of the Lower Orakzai Agency. On 12 April security forces claimed to have extended their control over more areas of Orakzai Agency and were  advancing to Upper Orakzai Agency. Militants began fleeing to parts of Tirah Valley which border Khyber Agency.

5 May. Operation in Lower Orakzai Agency end
On 5 May operations in Lower Orakzai end with 5 thousand Pakistani families returned to the area with government provided transport and security to settle these refugees back into their homes. The  offensive which started on 22 March ended with seven thousand troops seizing control of the area. About 400 militants were killed in Lower Orakzai and soldiers are now fighting in central Orakzai, according to the army.

10–19 May. Ongoing clashes in Orakzai. 118 insurgents killed. 11 soldiers killed.
10 May.At least nine soldiers have been killed in clashes and about 30 insurgents were also killed in Pakistan's north-western tribal region of Orakzai. Military officials described the battle between the insurgents and the army as "fierce" and said that two officers were among the dead.
16 May."Fighter jets and helicopter gunships attacked militant sanctuaries in the villages of Dabori, Gojar and Kamer Mela in Orakzai, killing 40 suspected insurgents", said Samiullah Khan, a senior government administrator in Orakzai."Troops attacked militant hide-outs in Koul village, triggering clashes that killed 18 suspected insurgents.Five soldiers and at least 25 militants were wounded in the fighting. The injured militants were taken into custody", said Jehanzeb Khan, a local administrator. 17 May it became known that the total number of dead militants had reached 60.19 May. There was another military clash between Pakistani troops and the Taliban. According to the army killed 28 insurgents and wounded 21. Also killed in the fighting two Pakistani soldiers.

1 June. Successful end to military offensive in Orakzai. Preparation for the offensive in North Waziristan
The Pakistan Army has declared an end to military offensive in Orakzai after announcing it has fully cleared Orakzai of Taliban., however locals clams that while Lower Orakzai is clearned the situation in Central and Upper Orakzai has not changed much.To date, Pakistani authorities plan to begin full-scale military offensive in North Waziristan. According to Pakistani authorities in North Waziristan is the Taliban leadership and al-Qaeda.

3 June. Pakistani Army declared victory in Kurram
According to the Pakistani Army, Taliban insurgents had also been cleared from the Kurram Agency.

Clashes in Orakzai and Kurram

2010
13 June. At least 44 Taliban insurgents were killed by the Pakistani army in the ongoing military operation in the tribal areas of Pakistan (mainly military clashes continue in the Upper Orakzai region. and Kurram). Also, in this military clash 6 Pakistani soldiers were killed.
16 June.The insurgents kidnapped 60 people in Kurram.
20 June.Pakistani air strike killed at least 13 Taliban insurgents in the Orakzai Agency.
21–22 June. At least 4 Pakistani army soldiers and 43 Taliban insurgents were killed during two days in the Orakzai Agency tribal areas.23 June. A new clash in the Orakzai Agency, killed at least 24 Taliban insurgents and 1 Pakistani paramilitary soldier. Also nine soldiers were reportedly wounded.
24 June. At least 39 Taliban insurgents were killed by the Pakistani Army in Upper Orakzai. It was reported that 1 Pakistani soldier was also apparently killed.
26 June. At least 14 Taliban insurgents were killed in the Orakzai Agency by Pakistani fighter jet.
28 June At least 12 Taliban insurgents were killed and two security men were injured in military clashes within the Upper Orakzai agency in north-western Pakistan.
29 June. At least 66 Taliban insurgents were killed and another 30 injured in airstrikes and clashes with the security forces across the country's North-West. At least 4 Pakistani soldiers were also killed. At least 10 Taliban insurgents were killed by Pakistani Army in Kurram Agency.
30 June. At least 20 Taliban insurgents were killed in the Orakzai Agency after a Pakistani airstrike.
1 July. After a military clash between two armed groups, at least 10 Taliban insurgents were killed. As said by Pakistani sources - many of the militants from Orakzai Agency emigrating into the Kurram Agency.
4 July. At least 26 Taliban insurgents were killed and many other militants were injured after Pakistani military's jets launched airstrikes within the Orakzai Agency, in north western Pakistan.
5 July. At least 22 Taliban insurgents were killed by Pakistani fighter jets.
6 July. According to the Pakistani command: 80% of the Kurram Agency has been cleared of insurgents. In ongoing military clashes in the Kurram Agency, at least 18 Pakistani soldiers and 96 Taliban insurgents were killed.
8 July. At least 14 Taliban insurgents were killed and 10 others were wounded after the Pakistani Armed Forces launched several airstrikes within the Orakzai Agency, in north western Pakistan.
9–10 July. For two days in the Orakzai Agency, at least 27 Taliban insurgents were killed in two separate airstrikes by Pakistani fighter jets.
14 July. Pakistani troops killed at least 24 Taliban insurgents, among the dead rebels was a senior Taliban commander, Taj Gul.
16 July. At least 22 Taliban insurgents were killed and 13 others were reportedly injured during an attack on their hideouts within the Orakzai Agency tribal regions, which was conducted by Pakistani security forces. In the Kurram Agency, Pakistani Taliban fired on the convoy with civilians, killing at least 16 people.
18 July. At least 15 Taliban insurgents were killed after Pakistani military fighter jets bombarded militant positions and destroyed eight militant hideouts, in the Mamuzai district of the Orakzai Agency tribal regions.
20 July. At least 42 Taliban insurgents were killed by Pakistani security forces in both the Kurram Agency and Orakzai Agency tribal regions, which are located near to the Pakistan-Afghanistan border. In one incident Pakistan's military aerially bombarded militant hideouts in the Upper Orakzai region, killing 20 insurgents and wounding a further 15 others. Meanwhile, within the Kurram Agency, security forces targeted Taliban hideouts in a pre-dawn assault. It was later reported that 22 insurgents were killed and 11 others were apparently injured during this operation.
21 July. At least 30 Taliban insurgents were killed by the Pakistani Army in the Orakzai Agency.
22 July.  At least 3 Pakistani army soldiers and 33 Taliban insurgents were killed in bloody clashes in the Orakzai Agency.
23 July. At least 29 Taliban insurgents were killed in airstrikes and military clashes with the Pakistani Army in the north-western tribal region of the Orakzai Agency. Meanwhile, it was also reported that 5 Taliban insurgents were apparently killed in clashes with tribesmen, in the tribal region of Kurram Agency, which is located near to the Afghan-Pakistan border.
24 July. At least 39 Taliban insurgents were killed and many other insurgents were reportedly injured after the Pakistani Army launched a fresh military operation within different areas of the Upper Orakzai tribal regions, in north-western Pakistan. It was also reported that 3 Taliban insurgents and 1 Tribesman were reportedly killed in clashes within the Kurram Agency.
25 July. At least 23 Taliban insurgents were reportedly killed in Orakzai by fighter jets.
26 July. At least 34 Taliban insurgents were killed and 18 injured from Pakistani fighter jet attacks in Orakzai and Kurram.
27 July. 14 Taliban insurgents were killed in Pakistani fighter jet attacks in Orakzai.
30 July. 12 Taliban insurgents were killed in Kurrum when Pakistani security forces attacked militant positions.
1 August. 15 Taliban Insurgents were killed by Pakistani Aircraft Fighters in Orakzai.
2 August. At least 15 Taliban insurgents were killed by Pakistani Army in Orakzai Agency.
3 August. At least 12 Taliban insurgents were killed by Pakistani Security Forces in Upper Orakzai.
19 August. At least 14 Taliban insurgents were killed in military clashes with the Pakistani security forces, in the Tapu region of the Orakzai Agency. It was reported that at least 1 Pakistani soldier was also killed in the clashes and another soldier was apparently injured.
20 August. At least 11 Taliban insurgents were killed by Pakistani Army in Orakzai and Kurram Agency.
21 August. At least 8 Taliban insurgents were killed by Pakistani Army in Orakzai Agency. It was reported that at least 1 Pakistani soldier was also killed in this clashes.
23 August. At least 2 Taliban insurgents were killed by Pakistani Security Forces in Orakzai Agency. A bomb exploded in Kurram Agency, at least 7 citizens were killed.
25 August. At least 7 Taliban insurgents, including an important Taliban commander, were killed and 3 others were reportedly injured in a military clash with the Pakistani military within the Upper Orakzai region of north-western Pakistan.
2 September. At least 15 Taliban insurgents were killed and 10 others were reportedly injured after three militant hideouts were destroyed by helicopter gunships of the Pakistani Army, in the Kurram tribal region of north-western Pakistan.
7 September. The Pakistani army claimed it has cleared nearly 90% of Orakzai Agency of militants and now is helping the area's displaced persons return home
10 September. 7 insurgents open fire on four local high school students in Orakzai, killing them. In an outrage, local civilians and tribesmen track and kill the 7 taliban insurgents.
20 September. At least 8 Taliban insurgents were killed and 7 others were reportedly injured when Pakistani helicopter gunships attacked militant positions, in the Kurram Agency.
5 October. At least 18 Taliban insurgents were killed and another 6 were injured when Pakistani helicopter gunships attacked militant positions in central Kurram Agency.
21 October. At least 6 Taliban insurgents were killed by a roadside bomb in Kurram Agency. Among the dead rebels was a top Taliban commander, Hakim Khan.
22 October. At least 6 Pakistani soldiers were killed by a roadside bomb in the Orakzai Agency.
23 October. At least 18 Pakistani Taliban insurgents were killed and 12 others injured, when the Pakistan Army, targeted and destroyed several militant hide-outs, as a result of Pakistani Army troops backed up by helicopter gunships in the Orakzai Agency. Meanwhile, it was also reported that Pakistani paramilitary forces, pounded suspected militant positions, killing 5 Pakistani Taliban insurgents and injuring 7 others within the neighbouring Kurram Agency.
26 October. At least 6 Taliban insurgents were killed by Pakistani Army in Orakzai Agency. It was reported that at least 1 Pakistani soldier was also killed in this clash.
27 October. Inspector General Frontier Corps Major General Nadir Zaib said that 90 percent of Orakzai agency areas have been cleared from the terrorists, adding, during the past few months 650 Taliban have been killed, 250 captured and 60 officers were killed while 194 sustained injuries, while for the remaining 10 percent the security forces are doing a successful operation. He also stated that Corps commander Peshawar Lieutenant General Asif Yasin while briefing the media in Orakzai Agency said the Pakistan army has strong intentions of clearing the tribal areas from the Taliban by the year 2012 and that the valley of Tirah will also be cleared from the Taliban soon.
29 October. 20 Taliban are killed by Pakistani army shelling on hideouts in Orakzai.
1 November. At least 12 Taliban insurgents were killed and 9 others were reportedly injured after three militant hideouts were destroyed by helicopter gunships of the Pakistani Army, in the Orakzai tribal region of north-western Pakistan.
6 November. At least 22 Taliban militants are killed by shelling from Pakistani helicopter gunships on hideouts in Orakzai.
7 November. At least 5 Taliban insurgents were killed by unidentified armed men in Kurram Agency. Among the dead rebels was a Taliban commander, Hikmat Shah.
11 November. At least 15 Taliban insurgents were killed after Pakistani military fighter jets bombarded militant positions and destroyed militant hideouts, in the Upper Orakzai Agency. Top Taliban commander (Ziaullah) was arrested during this operation. At least 6 Taliban insurgents were killed by Pakistani Army in the Orakzai Agency.
13 November. At least 8 Taliban insurgents were killed by Pakistani Army in Orakzai Agency.
21 November. At least 15 Taliban insurgents were killed by Pakistani Army in Orakzai Agency.
25 November. At least 8 Taliban insurgents were killed by Pakistani Army in Orakzai Agency.
1 December. At least 10 Taliban militants were killed in a clash by the Pakistani Army in the Orakzai Agency.
6 December. Pakistan security forces stated that more than 85% of Orakzai is cleared and that they are working on clearing the remaining 15%, also Sunni and Shia tribal elders unanimously agreed during a grand peace jirga held at Kalaya, Orkazai Agency headquarters, on Sunday, to open all roads closed since 2005 for each other, and announced to take stern action jointly against elements found guilty of any subversive activity. The jirga was attended, among others, by FC Inspector General Maj Gen Nadir Zaib, Orakzai Political Agent Riaz Mehsud, religious scholars from both Sunni and Shia sects, tribal maliks, chieftains, Sikhs and elites of the areas. Representatives of the Haqqani network was reporably involved in talks.
23 December. At least 2 Pakistani citizens were injured after Taliban insurgents opened firing on a convoy in Kurram Agency.
29 December. At least 7 Taliban insurgents were killed by shelling from Pakistani helicopter gunships on hideouts in Kurram Agency.
30 December. At least 20 Taliban insurgents were killed by shelling from Pakistani helicopter gunships on hideouts in Kurram tribal region.

2011
4 January. Taliban insurgents chopped off a hand of a local resident who was convicted of theft in Orakzai Agency.
6 January. At least 6 Taliban insurgents were killed by Pakistani tribal volunteers in Orakzai Agency.
7 January. At least 46 Taliban insurgents were arrested by Pakistani army forces in Kurram Agency.
11 January. At least 5 Taliban insurgents were killed by unspecified militants in Kurram Agency.
21 January. According to sources most of the areas of Orakzai Agency have been cleared of militants while about 10 per cent area including Sefal Darra, Kasha, Wood Mela, Mamozai and Ahang is still under their control.

See also

 Operation Rah-e-Nijat
 KPK Insurgency
 Operation Swift Retort

References

External links
 http://english.aljazeera.net/news/asia/2010/06/20106618450763838.html

Wars involving the Taliban
Waziristan
War on terror
Military operations involving Pakistan
Conflicts in 2010
Conflicts in 2011